The Sun News is a daily newspaper published in Myrtle Beach, South Carolina, in the United States. It serves the Grand Strand region of South Carolina with a daily circulation of 19,773 and a Sunday circulation of 26,798. It is owned by Chatham Asset Management.

The Myrtle Beach News was founded as a weekly in 1935 by brothers-in-law C. L. Phillips and J. Clarence Macklen.  They had recently started a printing business, and local merchants asked them to do a local newspaper. In 1961, it was sold to Mark Garner, publisher of Myrtle Beach's other newspaper, the Myrtle Beach Sun (started in 1950). Garner merged the two papers into The Sun News, and soon began publishing twice weekly.  With the explosive growth that occurred in the next half century, as the Grand Strand became a major tourist and retirement area, the paper stepped up its publication schedule, becoming a full-fledged daily by 1977. It was eventually acquired by The State Record Company in 1973.

Along with the rest of the State Record Company, it merged with the Knight Ridder newspaper chain in 1986. McClatchy became The Sun News’ parent company when it purchased Knight Ridder in June 2006. McClatchy filed for bankruptcy in 2020 and the company was purchased by Chatham Asset Management for $312 million.

See also

 List of newspapers in South Carolina

References

External links
The Sun News official site
The Sun News official mobile site
The McClatchy Company's subsidiary profile of The Sun News
 The Sun News Self-Service Advertising - McClatchy Ad Manager
 McClatchy Advertising - WinWithMcClatchy.com

Newspapers published in South Carolina
McClatchy publications
Myrtle Beach, South Carolina
Publications established in 1935
1935 establishments in South Carolina